In mathematics, specifically group theory, a nilpotent group G is a group that has an upper central series that terminates with G. Equivalently, its central series is of finite length or its lower central series terminates with {1}.

Intuitively, a nilpotent group is a group that is "almost abelian". This idea is motivated by the fact that nilpotent groups are solvable, and for finite nilpotent groups, two elements having relatively prime orders must commute. It is also true that finite nilpotent groups are supersolvable. The concept is credited to work in the 1930s by Russian mathematician Sergei Chernikov.

Nilpotent groups arise in Galois theory, as well as in the classification of groups. They also appear prominently in the classification of Lie groups.

Analogous terms are used for Lie algebras (using the Lie bracket) including nilpotent, lower central series, and upper central series.

Definition
The definition uses the idea of a central series for a group. The following are equivalent definitions for a nilpotent group :

(By definition, the length is  if there are  different subgroups in the series, including the trivial subgroup and the whole group.)

Equivalently, the nilpotency class of  equals the length of the lower central series or upper central series.
If a group has nilpotency class at most , then it is sometimes called a nil- group.

It follows immediately from any of the above forms of the definition of nilpotency, that the trivial group is the unique group of nilpotency class , and groups of nilpotency class  are exactly the non-trivial abelian groups.

Examples

 As noted above, every abelian group is nilpotent.
 For a small non-abelian example, consider the quaternion group Q8, which is a smallest non-abelian p-group. It has center {1, −1} of order 2, and its upper central series is {1}, {1, −1}, Q8; so it is nilpotent of class 2.
 The direct product of two nilpotent groups is nilpotent.
 All finite p-groups are in fact nilpotent (proof). The maximal class of a group of order pn is n (for example, any group of order 2 is nilpotent of class 1). The 2-groups of maximal class are the generalised quaternion groups, the dihedral groups, and the semidihedral groups.
 Furthermore, every finite nilpotent group is the direct product of p-groups.
 The multiplicative group of upper unitriangular n × n matrices over any field F is a nilpotent group of nilpotency class n − 1. In particular, taking n = 3 yields the Heisenberg group H, an example of a non-abelian infinite nilpotent group. It has nilpotency class 2 with central series 1, Z(H), H.
 The multiplicative group of invertible upper triangular n × n matrices over a field F is not in general nilpotent, but is solvable.
 Any nonabelian group G such that G/Z(G) is abelian has nilpotency class 2, with central series {1}, Z(G), G.

The natural numbers k for which any group of order k is nilpotent have been characterized .

Explanation of term

They are proven to be nilpotent if they have finite order, and are conjectured to be nilpotent as long as they are finitely generated.

An abelian group is precisely one for which the adjoint action is not just nilpotent but trivial (a 1-Engel group).

Properties

Since each successive factor group Zi+1/Zi in the upper central series is abelian, and the series is finite, every nilpotent group is a solvable group with a relatively simple structure.

Every subgroup of a nilpotent group of class n is nilpotent of class at most n; in addition, if f is a homomorphism of a nilpotent group of class n, then the image of f is nilpotent of class at most n.

The following statements are equivalent for finite groups, revealing some useful properties of nilpotency:

Proof:
 (a)→(b) By induction on |G|. If G is abelian, then for any H, NG(H) = G. If not, if Z(G) is not contained in H, then hZHZ−1h−1 = h'H'h−1 = H, so H·Z(G) normalizers H. If Z(G) is contained in H, then H/Z(G) is contained in G/Z(G). Note, G/Z(G) is a nilpotent group. Thus, there exists a subgroup of G/Z(G) which normalizes H/Z(G)  and H/Z(G) is a proper subgroup of it. Therefore, pullback this subgroup to the subgroup in G and it normalizes H. (This proof is the same argument as for p-groupsthe only fact we needed was if G is nilpotent then so is G/Z(G)so the details are omitted.)
 (b)→(c) Let p1,p2,...,ps be the distinct primes dividing its order and let Pi in Sylpi(G), 1 ≤ i ≤ s. Let P = Pi for some i and let N = NG(P). Since P is a normal Sylow subgroup of N, P is characteristic in N. Since P char N and N is a normal subgroup of NG(N), we get that P is a normal subgroup of NG(N). This means NG(N) is a subgroup of N and hence NG(N) = N. By (b) we must therefore have N = G, which gives (c).
 (c)→(d) Let p1,p2,...,ps be the distinct primes dividing its order and let Pi in Sylpi(G), 1 ≤ i ≤ s. For any t, 1 ≤ t ≤ s we show inductively that P1P2···Pt is isomorphic to P1×P2×···×Pt. Note first that each Pi is normal in G so P1P2···Pt is a subgroup of G. Let H be the product P1P2···Pt−1 and let K = Pt, so by induction H is isomorphic to P1×P2×···×Pt−1. In particular,|H| = |P1|⋅|P2|⋅···⋅|Pt−1|. Since |K| = |Pt|, the orders of H and K are relatively prime. Lagrange's Theorem implies the intersection of H and K is equal to 1. By definition,P1P2···Pt = HK, hence HK is isomorphic to H×K which is equal to P1×P2×···×Pt. This completes the induction. Now take t = s to obtain (d).
 (d)→(e) Note that a p-group of order pk has a normal subgroup of order pm for all 1≤m≤k. Since G is a direct product of its Sylow subgroups, and normality is preserved upon direct product of groups, G has a normal subgroup of order d for every divisor d of |G|.
 (e)→(a) For any prime p dividing |G|, the Sylow p-subgroup is normal. Thus we can apply (c) (since we already proved (c)→(e)).

Statement (d) can be extended to infinite groups: if G is a nilpotent group, then every Sylow subgroup Gp of G is normal, and the direct product of these Sylow subgroups is the subgroup of all elements of finite order in G (see torsion subgroup).

Many properties of nilpotent groups are shared by hypercentral groups.

Notes

References
 
 
 
 
 
  review
 
 
 

Nilpotent groups
Properties of groups